Association football is one of the sports played at the Central American and Caribbean Games, a quadrennial multi-sports event for countries in those regions. The Games can involve eligible national teams from two football confederations, CONCACAF and CONMEBOL.

A men's tournament was first held in the second edition of the Games in 1930. 

The first women's event was held in 2010. In 2010, only a women's tournament was played, but both men's and women's events have been held in subsequent editions. The women's tournament is for senior national women's teams.

The following is a summary of the football championships at the Central American and Caribbean Games.

Tournament history
Source:

Men's tournament
The men's tournament has changed several times regarding player eligibility.

In the first men's tournaments, full senior squads competed, but now the men's tournament is only for under-20 teams.

In full:

 1930–1946: Full senior squads
 1950–1986: Amateur squads
 1990: Under-23 squads
 1993-now: Under-20 squads

Men's medallists

Women's tournament
The women's tournament is for senior national teams, and was established at the 2010 Central American and Caribbean Games.

Women's medallists

Medal count

All-time top goalscorers (until 1974)

Hat-tricks (until 1974)
Since the first official tournament in 1930 until the edition in 1974, 40 hat-tricks have been scored in over 100 matches of the 11 editions of the tournament in-between that period. The first hat-trick was scored by Rafael Madrigal of Costa Rica, playing against Guatemala on 17 March 1930; and the last was by Martín Zúñiga of Mexico, playing against Jamaica on 22 November 2014. The record number of hat-tricks in a single Central American and Caribbean Games is ten, during the 1946 edition. The only player to have scored three hat-tricks is Costa Rica's Hernán Bolaños, one in the inaugural edition in 1930 and two in 1938, in which he was the top goal scorer with 10 goals. He is closely followed by Rafael Madrigal, Hilario López, Emmanuel Amador, Gonzalo Fernández, José Verdecia and Francisco Piedra with two hat-tricks each. The record for the most goals scored in a single Central American and Caribbean Game is 7, which has been achieved once: by Maximiliano Juliana when he scored 7 for Netherlands Antilles in a 14-0 win over Puerto Rico. Puerto Rico also holds the record for most hat-tricks conceded with 15, with the next closest being Honduras and Guatemala with 6. On the other hand, Costa Rica holds the record for most hat-tricks scored with 11, with the next closest being Cuba with 7.

List

Footnotes

A. Final stage was a round-robin group.
B. The Colombian football team were awarded bronze medals in spite of having been thrown out of the tournament.

See also
 Football at the Pan American Games
 Football at the Central American Games

References 

 
Football
Central American and Caribbean Games
Central
Central American and Caribbean Games